Craugastor taylori is a species of frog in the family Craugastoridae. It is endemic to Mexico and only known from its type locality near Rayón Mescalapa, Chiapas, in Southeast Mexico. Its common name is Taylor's robber frog. It is named in honour of Edward Harrison Taylor.

Description
Craugastor taylori resembles Craugastor megalotympanum, which may be its closest relative. The holotype of Craugastor taylori, a male, measures  in snout–vent length. Dorsum is smooth and pale cream in colour. Skin has some faint markings; limbs are banded. Tympanum is distinct and relatively large, ¾ of the eye diameter. Head is broader than long and snout is long.

Habitat and conservation
Its natural habitat is presumably montane forest. The original description does not mention the specific habitat but refers to collections in cloud forests. It is a protected species in Mexico.

References

taylori
Endemic amphibians of Mexico
Amphibians described in 1966
Taxa named by John Douglas Lynch
Taxonomy articles created by Polbot